Birds Australia Victoria (BA-VIC) was the Victorian regional group of Birds Australia.

BA-VIC was formed in 1982.  Members of Birds Australia resident in Victoria were automatically members of BA-VIC.  The quarterly newsletter was Vic Babbler.  Activities provided for members include monthly meetings, a variety of excursions and campouts, bird surveys and conservation projects. Past Presidents include prominent ornithologists Tim Dolby and Margaret Cameron.

In 2009, in association with Allen & Unwin, BA-VIC published a new bird book, Where to See Birds in Victoria, edited by Tim Dolby, featuring the best places in Victoria for seeing birds. Despite being Australia's smallest mainland state, its varied landscapes provide habitat for more than 500 bird species. The book also provides a comprehensive and up-to-date list of birds, with the degree of rarity and where to see it noted for each species.

External links
 Birds Australia - Victoria
 Birdline Victoria
 Where to See Birds in Victoria

Ornithological organisations in Australia
1982 establishments in Australia
Organisations based in Victoria (Australia)